The five-second rule, sometimes known as the three-second rule, is a food hygiene myth that states a defined time window where it is safe to pick up food (or sometimes cutlery) after it has been dropped on the floor or on the ground and thus exposed to contamination.

There appears to be no scientific consensus on the general applicability of the rule, and its origin is unclear. It probably originated succeeding germ theory in the late 19th century. The first known mention of the rule in print is in the 1995 novel Wanted: Rowing Coach.

Research 
The five-second rule has received some scholarly attention. It has been studied as both a public health recommendation and a sociological effect.

University of Illinois 
In 2003, Jillian Clarke of the University of Illinois at Urbana–Champaign found in a survey that 56% of men and 70% of women surveyed, were familiar with the five-second rule. She also determined that a variety of foods were significantly contaminated by even brief exposure to a tile inoculated with E. coli. On the other hand, Clarke found no significant evidence of contamination on public flooring. For this work, Clarke received the 2004  Prize in public health.
A more thorough study in 2006 using salmonella on wood, tiles, and nylon carpet, found that the bacteria were able to thrive under dry conditions even after twenty-eight days. Tested on surfaces that had been contaminated with salmonella eight hours previously, the bacteria were still able to contaminate bread and bologna in under five seconds. But a minute-long contact increased contamination about tenfold (especially tile and carpet surfaces).

Rutgers University 
The surfaces used were carpet, ceramic tile, stainless steel and wood. The food was left on the surface in intervals of 5, 30 and 300 seconds. The scientists assessed the amount of E. aerogenes transferred between surface and food. Since bacteria tended to be attracted to moisture, wet food had more risk to have bacteria transferred than dry food. To the surprise of the researchers, carpet transferred fewer bacteria than steel or tile. Wood was hard to pin down as it showed a large variation. "The five-second rule is a significant oversimplification of what actually happens when bacteria transfer from a surface to food," Donald Schaffner, a Rutgers University biologist and an author of the research, said in a statement in the Washington Post. "Bacteria can contaminate instantaneously."

A pediatrician criticized the study for discounting the danger in consuming certain foods dropped onto floors.

Other
A 2006 study at Clemson University was unable to verify the rule, when looking at tile, wood, and carpet floors. It indicated that bacteria can survive on the ground for a long time.

A 2014 study by biology students at Aston University in England suggested that there may be a basis for the five-second rule. Anthony Hilton, head of microbiology at Aston University, indicated in 2017 that food dropped on a seemingly clean floor for a few moments can be eaten with minimal risk.

Informal
The five-second rule was featured in an episode of the Discovery Channel series MythBusters, which discovered that there was no significant difference in the number of bacteria collected. The aspects that affect the contamination process is the moisture, surface geometry and the location.

Ted Allen put the rule to the test in an episode of Food Detectives, and found that bacteria will cling to food immediately.

The YouTube channel Vsauce also dedicated a video to this topic, concluding that it would be more correct to call it the "Don't Touch Food That's Fallen on the Floor Rule".

References 

American cultural conventions
Food safety
Misconceptions
Rules of thumb
Applied microbiology
Urban legends
Pseudoscience